Jack Goulding (born 1998) is an Irish hurler who plays as a right corner-forward at senior level for the Kerry county team.

Born in Ballyduff, County Kerry, Goulding first played competitive hurling at Causeway Comprehensive School. He simultaneously came to prominence at juvenile and underage levels with the Ballyduff club. He subsequently won a county championship medal with the club's senior team.

Goulding made his debut on the inter-county scene as a member of the Kerry minor team as a dual player. He enjoyed several championship seasons in this grade, culminating with the winning of All-Ireland medals in both codes. He subsequently joined the Kerry under-21 hurling team, winning an All-Ireland medal in 2017. By this stage Goulding had already joined the Kerry senior team, making his debut during the 2016 league.

Goulding won the 2020 London Senior Football Championship with Fulham Irish, coming on as a substitute and scoring a decisive goal in Extra Time from almost 60 yards.

Honours

Ballyduff
Kerry Senior Hurling Championship (1): 2017

Fulham Irish
London Senior Football Championship (1): 2020

Kerry
All-Ireland Under-21 B Hurling Championship (1): 2017
All-Ireland Minor Football Championship (1): 2015
Munster Minor Football Championship (1): 2015
All-Ireland Minor B Hurling Championship (1): 2014

References

1998 births
Living people
Ballyduff (Kerry) hurlers
Kerry inter-county hurlers
Kerry inter-county Gaelic footballers